Prairie State Park is a public recreation area encompassing nearly  of grasslands and woodlands in Barton County, Missouri. The state park preserves much of the few remaining acres of tallgrass prairie in the state. The park features hiking trails, camping for backpackers, and a nature center. Captive wild bison and elk roam the park.The bison herd contains about 100 individuals as of spring 2021.

Ecology
Prairie State Park is in the central forest-grasslands transition ecoregion of the temperate grasslands, savannas and shrublands biome.

References

External links

Prairie State Park Missouri Department of Natural Resources 
Prairie State Park Map Missouri Department of Natural Resources 

State parks of Missouri
Grasslands of the North American Great Plains
Protected areas of Barton County, Missouri
Protected areas established in 1980
Grasslands of Missouri